David Cánovas Martínez (born 24 April 1997), better known as TheGrefg or simply Grefg, is a Spanish YouTuber and Twitch streamer. With 17.8 million subscribers, it is one of the most-subscribed Spanish YouTube channels, while he also has the seventh most-followed Twitch channel with over 10.2 million followers.

TheGrefg used to hold the Guinness World Record for the most concurrent viewers for a Twitch stream, after achieving a peak concurrent viewership of 2,468,668 during the live presentation of his own Fortnite outfit, on 11 January 2021. This record was broken by Ibai Llanos in 2022, when a total of 3.3 million viewers arrived during La velada del año 2.

Career 
David Cánovas Martínez was born on 24 April 1997, in Alhama de Murcia, Murcia, Spain, according to several interviews, he began to be interested in the subject of video games since he was a child, he started his YouTube channel on 30 January 2012, when he was 14 years old.

In 2018 he moved to Andorra to pay less taxes. In January 2020, Epic Games announced that a TheGrefg-based cosmetic outfit would be added to Fortnite alongside other real-life personalities associated with the game such as Ninja and Loserfruit. In October 2020, Forbes Spain included Cánovas as the sixth top influencer in Spain for the year, in April 2021 was again included in a cover of the magazine Forbes.

Writing career 
Martínez has written three books; The first book titled "Rescate en White Angel (The G-Squad)" was released in 2017, the second titled "Los secretos de YouTube" was released in 2018, and the third book titled "Todo lo que necesitas saber sobre esports" made in collaboration with Goorgo and MethodzSick and released on 4 June 2019, tells the "secrets to succeed in e-Sports".

Other works 
To date he has released three songs. The first one, titled "Gracias a ti" was to celebrate his 4 million subscribers. Again, to celebrate 10 million subscribers he released a song in collaboration with Zarcort and Piter-G. Lastly, to present his Minecraft series Calvaland released a song titled as the same. Martínez was one of the presenters along with Willyrex and El Rubius of the program Top Gamers Academy, In January 2022, he held the ESLAND Awards ceremony, in which several Spanish-speaking content creators would receive their recognition.

Awards and nominations

See also 
 List of most-followed Twitch channels

References

External links 
 TheGrefg on Twitch

People from the Region of Murcia
Spanish YouTubers
Spanish-language YouTubers
Living people
20th-century Spanish people
YouTube vloggers
Twitch (service) streamers
Gaming YouTubers
1997 births
Spanish emigrants to Andorra